Kamila Dadakhodjaeva (born 6 October 1983) is an Uzbekistani former tennis player.

Born in Tashkent, Dadakhodjaeva was a playing member of Uzbekistan's Fed Cup side between 1999 and 2002, appearing in a total of eight ties. She featured in the singles and doubles main draws of the 2000 Tashkent Open.

Dadakhodjaeva played collegiate tennis for Auburn University at Montgomery.

References

External links
 
 
 

1983 births
Living people
Uzbekistani female tennis players
Auburn Montgomery Warhawks women's tennis players
Sportspeople from Tashkent
21st-century Uzbekistani women